Orson Welles acted in a series of advertisements for Paul Masson California wine from 1978 to 1981, best known for their slogan "We will sell no wine before its time," becoming a much-parodied cultural trope of the late twentieth century. Years later, the commercials regained notoriety when a bootleg recording of out-takes was distributed, showing an apparently inebriated Welles on the set of one of the commercials.

Background
In 1978, Paul Masson's California wines hired actor-director Orson Welles to make a commercial for their "Emerald Dry" white table wine. Although Paul Masson's winery had been producing California wines since 1892, they had long catered to the lower end of the wine market, and this commercial was part of a concerted effort by the company to rebrand itself as a higher-end wine producer, tying in with a period of diversification, when they were seeking to expand from the sparkling wines which had first brought them success, and to sell more of their other wine ranges, including chablis, burgundy, riesling, chardonnay, cabernet sauvignon, port and sherry. As the New York Times noted in 1990, Paul Masson's long-term problem remained the same: "While many consumers know them—who can forget Orson Welles's breathy incantation of 'We will sell no wine before its time' for Masson—they lack cachet." After the success of the initial commercial, Welles was signed to a Paul Masson contract worth $500,000 a year (worth $2 million in 2021) plus residuals, making further ads for the brand on television and in print, which continued for three years until his sacking by the company in 1981. Despite Welles's poor behaviour on set, Paul Masson was described as "a very happy client," with sales of their wine reportedly rising by 30% during the Welles advertising campaign.

By this stage in his career, Welles found it nearly impossible to obtain work as a director (his last directorial credit to be released in his lifetime was a TV movie for West German television, which aired in 1978); and from the mid-1970s onwards, his only acting credits were cameo appearances, mostly in low-budget fare. Accordingly, he was heavily dependent for his income on a series of ads, for products of variable quality. These included Carlsberg beer, Domecq sherry, Sandeman's port (playing the "Sandeman Don" in a TV advertisement), Jim Beam bourbon whisky, Nikka Japanese G&G whisky, Perrier mineral water, Nashua photocopiers, Vivitar instant cameras, Preview pay-per-view television, the board game Dark Tower, Eastern Air Lines, Texaco, Post's Shredded Wheat, Hayden Flour Mills, Lone Star Cement, and perhaps most infamously, Findus frozen foods. Although Welles had made ads for his entire career, beginning when he was a well-known radio actor in the 1930s, by the late 1970s these had become his staple, and he was often (anonymously) directing them as well. John Annarino, the advertising executive handling the Paul Masson account at the time, remembered that Welles, "was eager for almost any kind of work in the early 1980s, hoping to complete a film that was languishing in some European vault (The Other Side of the Wind)." Welles was often highly dismissive of the work, pointing out that he tended to be hired "to give a little class" to such productions.

Offscreen, Welles was noticeably dismissive about the Paul Masson commercials' often-pretentious claims to high culture. When asked during shooting to liken a Paul Masson wine to a violin by Stradivarius, he complained, "Come on, gentlemen, now really! You have a nice, pleasant little cheap wine here. You haven't gotten the presumption to compare it to a Stradivarius violin. It's odious." Welles was not alone in mocking the pretensions of the adverts—even crew members on the set would spout spoofs such as, "We will sell the swine no more wine until it's brine!"

Tensions between Welles and DDB Needham
The advertising campaign was marked by noticeable animosity between Welles and the advertising agency which commissioned the ads, DDB Needham. Welles once complained to his regular lunching companion, the director Henry Jaglom, "I have never seen more seedier, about-to-be-fired sad sacks than were responsible for those Paul Masson ads. The agency hated me because I kept trying to improve their copy." The DDB Needham executive who handled the Paul Masson account, John Annarino, responded to the 2013 publication of Welles transcripts describing the commercials by sharing his own reminiscences with his local paper, The Desert Sun, and recalling of the experience, "It was no picnic." This acrimony was underlined by the Assistant Director, Peter Shillingford, who recalled:

Shillingford notes that during the infamous drunken out-take, "The agency men were furious. They were talking about suing him, talking about firing him. They hated him anyway." However, he went on to describe how the adverts usually proceeded:

Crew
 Producer: John Annarino
 Director: Jim Hallowes
 Production Supervisor, Assistant Director and Clapperboard Assistant: Peter Shillingford (first five adverts only)
 Cinematographer: Mike Chevalier
 First assistant camera: Randall Robinson

Ad synopses

1978: Original ad—Beethoven, Emerald Dry

The first Paul Masson ad had Welles listening to the opening of Beethoven's Fifth Symphony on a record player, and remarking:

John Annarino recalls that Welles could be difficult on set, and the first ad was no exception:

A brief out-take survives from the first advert, of Welles scowling upon being told, "Action!", holding his hand up and saying, "Do you mind not saying 'Action'?"

Subsequent commercials

1978: Dressing room, Rhine Castle

The second ad showed Welles with a bottle of Rhine Castle riesling in a theatre dressing room, in theatrical costume and makeup, telling the camera:

The setting of a theatre was a somewhat incongruous one—at the time of shooting, Welles had neither acted in nor directed any plays for 18 years. Annarino remembers filming the commercial:

1978: House party, "Champagne"

This showed Welles hosting a party, supposedly in his home (actually filmed in a rented Los Angeles mansion), with background piano accompaniment, telling the camera,

It was during the filming of this ad that Welles complained about the extras hired for the scene. Welles's biographer Barbara Leaming describes the occasion:

1979: Gone With the Wind, Emerald Dry

Reading a copy of Gone With the Wind at a table in the garden of his real-life house at 1717 North Stanley Avenue, off Hollywood Boulevard, Welles says:

This ad was reportedly a last-minute improvisation by Welles after he dismissed the original script he was given, which compared Paul Masson wine to a Stradivarius violin.

1980: "French" "Champagne"

In what inadvertently became the most famous Paul Masson ad due to the leaked out-takes (see below), Welles was found sitting at a drinks party with two unnamed young people, announcing,

Welles's drunken inability to get through this script without severely slurring his speech, visibly swaying as he propped himself up at the table, formed the basis of the out-takes. (At the time, laws around Protected Designation of Origin (PDO) did not prevent Paul Masson from advertising its Californian sparkling wine as "champagne." Subsequent changes in 1992 made this illegal for any wines not made from grapes grown in the Champagne region of France.)

1980: Chateau tasting party, Chablis

This had Welles seated in the gardens in front of the portal of Paul Masson's chateau (the entrance to an eighteenth century Spanish church, imported to Saratoga, California) in the San Francisco Bay Area, surrounded by young people:

1980: Barbecue, Burgundy

The penultimate time Welles appeared in a television ad in the series, this one had Welles seated at a barbecue, surrounded by young people:

1981: Park, Emerald Dry

This was Welles's last physical appearance in a Paul Masson television advert, and was restricted to one brief shot at the end of the ad, although he narrated. The advert has the minuet from Boccherini's String Quintet in E major playing in the background, and after a brief opening shot of the Paul Masson chateau, there follows a montage of rural landscapes and pouring wine, finishing on Welles in a park, as he narrates throughout:

1981: Europeans, Carafe
Welles simply provided the voiceover for his last Paul Masson television ad—he did not appear in person. The ad sought to promote a range of Paul Masson wines, focussing on the distinctive "carafe"-shaped bottle they came in, complete with jam-jar top, and portrayed various European families drinking wine with meals. The voiceover backed by guitar music stated:

This was the only Paul Masson television ad Welles did in which he did not say the phrase "will sell no wine before its time"—although a caption at the end does repeat this motto.

It appears that this version of the advert was short-lived. After Welles was sacked by Paul Masson, later in 1981 the commercial began running in a re-dubbed version, using the voiceover of a different narrator.

1980-1981: Print ads, Pinot Chardonnay and Cabernet Sauvignon
The last of Welles's adverts for Paul Masson were two print adverts featuring the director smiling over a glass and a bottle, released to tie in with the television adverts; one for Pinot Chardonnay, the other for Cabernet Sauvignon.

and

Out-takes

Drunken out-takes
The best-known series of out-takes consists of three takes for the "French champagne" advertisement. In the first, an off-screen voice yells "Action," but Welles does not react for eight full seconds. "Action Orson, please," the offscreen voice says after a pause. "He doesn't do anything?", asks Welles, referring to the actor holding the champagne bottle, seemingly unaware he himself was intended to act first.

The second and third takes consist of Welles attempting his monologue, though his words are slurred:
 
Welles was interrupted by an offscreen voice shouting "Cut!" before finishing his lines. Throughout the takes, Welles appears to be having trouble remaining upright, clearly propping himself up on the table while tapping his fingers impatiently, and several of the extras are visibly struggling not to laugh.

As part of his Paul Masson contract, Welles was given elaborate lunches prior to filming in the afternoon. John Annarino, the DDB Needham advertising executive handling the Paul Masson account, recalled that at these pre-shoot lunches, "Welles found it "barbaric" not to begin a meal with soup," and noted of Welles's lunchtime drinking, "Orson liked Paul Masson's cabernet. He often called the ad agency and instructed, 'Send more red.' The agency sent more red." It has been speculated that this is what may have led to his state during the recording session, however, Assistant Director Peter Shillingford disputed this: "I've read that he'd demand these huge meals, but he never ate lunch on the shoots I did with him. I'd sit with him and have a snack and he'd tell stories of old Hollywood and they were outrageous."

In 2021, Shillingford went on the record for the first time, to give a far fuller account of the day than had previously emerged:

Shillingford went on to describe what happened after the out-takes:

The final advert aired managed to avoid embarrassment about Welles's state, though it does not fully bear out Shillingford's insistence that Welles had wholly sobered up by the afternoon. The broadcast version used a combination of retakes (a close-up of Welles holding a champagne flute), cuts away from Welles to close-ups of the wine bottle, and some (not entirely synchronized) dubbing made by Welles later, when he was in a more sober state, over some of the footage shot when he was still evidently inebriated. Jim Hallowes, the director of the advertisement, observed on his personal website in 2009 that it was a "challenge...in dealing with a quite different side of Mr. Welles."

For decades, the clip was only available in blurry, faded Nth-generation duplicate copies circulated on VHS cassette. In recent years, high-quality versions can easily be found on YouTube, having been uploaded by the advert's director.

Beethoven out-takes
In addition to the well-known drunken out-takes, other out-takes from the first Paul Masson advert have circulated. These consist of two short takes. In the first, Welles begins saying, ""It took Beethoven four years to write that symphony," and starts to pour himself a glass of wine, before frowning at the bottle in his hand, and complaining to the director, "It's very hard for me to grab it, you've greased it. I'd better not hold it."

In the second out-take, the offscreen director shouts "Action!", only for Welles to scowl disapprovingly and hold up his hand at him, saying, "Do you mind not saying 'Action'?"

The sacking of Welles from the campaign
Welles was fired from the ad campaign in 1981. Ostensibly, the reason he was given was that the company wished to promote a new range of "light-bodied summer wines," and it was felt that the slimmer John Gielgud was a more appropriate choice of spokesman than the morbidly obese Welles. However, the wine Gielgud ended up advertising was not a "new" wine, but the same Chablis which Welles had already been advertising. Several Welles biographers have pointed to his unguarded comments on a TV chat show as the reason for his firing—specifically, when asked about the Paul Masson adverts, he mentioned that he was now dieting, and that he no longer drank wine.

Gielgud was not actually hired as Welles' replacement until 1982, whilst for the remainder of 1981, Masson aired both Welles' last "Carafe" advert with new narration dubbed over to remove his involvement, and a new Chablis advert with new narration. This lends further credence to the notion that Welles was sacked some time before Gielgud was engaged.

Gielgud was able to negotiate a $1 million fee (twice what Welles had been paid), and wrote of his own successor ads to George Pitcher in September 1983: "I bought some new pictures and sculpture with my ill-gotten gains. The Paul Masson commercials are apparently a great success and they have picked up a further six months profitable option." Between 1982 and 1985, Gielgud filmed several Paul Masson adverts based on his Academy Award-winning performance as the condescending butler in Arthur (1981), with Gielgud making catty observations whilst successively serving up Paul Masson wines in an art gallery, a fashion show, a diplomatic reception, and a stately home being cleaned. Gielgud further wrote of the perks in February 1985:

Gielgud also stipulated that he did not want the Paul Masson adverts—which he felt were beneath him—to be aired in his home country of the United Kingdom. This led to Paul Masson hiring English actor Ian Carmichael to do their British adverts after Welles.

In late September 1985, after Gielgud had shot his last commercial for the wine, the Davis & Gilbert advertising agency wrote to Welles, asking if he would be interested in resuming the Paul Masson adverts. They offered him $225,000 a year - half his old fee, and less than a quarter of what Gielgud had received - and asked him to make promotional appearances around the USA. At a lunch on 5 October 1985, Welles told his friend the director Henry Jaglom that he declined the offer, at least in part because he felt too old to be touring the country, and described it as a "terrible wine". Welles died a few days later.

Critical reception

Film critic Joseph McBride argues that the advertisements became synonymous with the perception of Welles as a recluse and a failure in his later years: "The commercial catchphrase ['We will sell no wine before its time'] became a joke, and a signature line for Welles himself, helping to define his personality in the media as that of a hedonist who preferred to dawdle over his vineyard interminably, releasing the fruits of his labor only rarely, if ever."

Parodies and popular culture

In the years since the adverts aired, their popularity has further grown as they have been the target of various spoofs and pastiches.

Even as the adverts were airing, they were subjected to parody—Steve Martin's 1980 TV special All Commercials... A Steve Martin Special, features Martin inducting Welles into the "Commercial Hall of Fame" for his three great works: "Citizen Kane, The Magnificent Ambersons, [and] Serve No Wine Before Its Time," and introducing a spoof beer advert in which Welles (played by John Candy) breaks down a wall for his entrance.

The 1990s cartoon series The Critic featured assorted parody adverts by Welles (or sometimes the ghost of Welles), voiced by Maurice LaMarche, in the style of the Paul Masson adverts. For instance, one advert for "Blotto Bros Wine" has Welles telling the viewer, "A rich, full-bodied wine, sensibly priced at a dollar a jug. And now for a little magic, I shall make this jug disappear," before promptly drinking the entire contents of the bottle in one swig.

The drunken Paul Masson out-take has also been a recurring target for YouTube pastiches in recent years, including spoofs by The Midnight Show and others.

The D.C.-based band "The French Champagne" takes its name from the 1980 advert and its out-takes.

References

External links
 'Paul Masson: Orson Welles, No Wine Before its Time' on IMDB
 Drunken Outtakes from 1980 Orson Welles commercial for Paul Masson

Television advertising
Advertising campaigns
Orson Welles
Works about wine
California wine